Duncan Paia'aua (born 20 January 1995) is an international sporting Samoan rugby union player of Australian origin who played centre for the Queensland Reds in the international Super Rugby competition between 2015 - 2019, and now plays for RC Toulon.

Family and early life
Paia'aua was born in Porirua, New Zealand but moved to Melbourne with his family at three years of age, and then settling in Rockhampton in 2002 playing junior league for Rockhampton Brothers. He played rugby at high school in Rockhampton and was twice selected for the Queensland Under 16 team.

He was chosen in the under 20 Junior Wallabies and competed in the Junior World Cup in Italy, June 2015, scoring 5 points for Australia.

Career
Paia'aua initially came through the Queensland Rugby Union's youth structures before switching to rugby league and linking up with the Brisbane Broncos where he represented their under-20s in the National Youth Competition. However, in August 2014 it was announced that he had switched back to rugby union and signed a 2-year contract with the Queensland Reds ahead of the 2015 Super Rugby season.   He subsequently played 1 game for Queensland Country in the first ever National Rugby Championship, leading them to victory in 2018 and runner-up in 2019 as captain. He made his debut for the Queensland Reds in round 1, 2015 against the Brumbies in Canberra.
On 28 October 2017, Paia'aua started for the Wallabies against the Barbarians at Allianz Stadium, Sydney.

Paia'aua represented Australia at the Wallabies vs Barbarians game in 2017 where he scored 16 of the 31 points. His outstanding performance caught the eyes of major international recruiters. Paia'aua currently plays 10 or 12 at RC Toulon

References

External links
 

1995 births
Australian rugby union players
Australian rugby league players
Australian sportspeople of Samoan descent
Rugby union fly-halves
Queensland Reds players
Queensland Country (NRC team) players
Sportspeople from Rockhampton
Living people